The Jiribam district of Manipur state in India is divided into 2 sub-divisions called circles. At the time of the 2011 Census of India, the area was a part of the Imphal East district: the Jiribam district was created in 2016.

Subdivisions 

The district is sub-divided into two circles:

 Jiribam circle
 Borobekra circle

Towns 

The district has one municipality:

Villages 

The district has following villages, with population figures from the 2011 census:

Jiribam circle 

The following villages were not present in the 2011 census directory:

 Babupura
 Khedagar
 Latingkhal Makha
 Leingangpokpi
 Mongbung
 Monjol
 Ningthembam (Bankhal)
 Kalinagar

Borobekra circle 

The following village was not present in the 2011 census directory: Gotaikhal.

Other villages 

In the 2011 census directory, the following villages were part of the Jiribam subdivision of the Imphal East district, but are not listed on the Jiribam district website as of 2023:

References 

Jiribam